Feh or variants may refer to:

Language 
Feh (letter), a variant of pe, 17th letter of the Semitic scripts
Feh (interjection), in Yiddish

Other uses
Feh (image viewer), command-line software
Iron(I) hydride (chemical formula: FeH)
Fire Emblem Heroes, a 2017 mobile video game by Nintendo